Sesamodil is a calcium channel blocker.

Calcium channel blockers
Benzodioxoles
Benzothiazines
Lactams
Phenol ethers